A holiday village (also abbreviated HV) is a holiday resort where the visitors stay in villas. There is a central area with shops, entertainment, and other amenities. One example is Center Parcs.